Leeuw is Dutch for lion. It occurs as a surname, most commonly in the form of De Leeuw ("the lion"; 9,814 people in the Netherlands in 2007 and 2,211 in Belgium in 1998). "De Leeuw",  “Leeuw” (873 & 34 people) and Van der Leeuw (765 & 9 people) are thought to mostly be toponymic surnames, with the first bearers named "(from) the Lion" after a house, windmill or farm with that name. The more common surname Van Leeuwen has a distinct origin in the small town of Leeuwen and perhaps in the city of Leuven.

Places
 Leeuwen
 Denderleeuw
 Zoutleeuw
 Sint-Pieters-Leeuw

People
People with these surnames include:
Leeuw
 Clinton Leeuw (born 1982), South African squash player
 Reginald Leeuw (fl. 2015), South African Anglican Dean
De Leeuw / DeLeeuw
 Adele DeLeeuw (1899–1988), American writer of Dutch-themed children's stories
 Bas de Leeuw (b. 1959), Dutch sustainability expert
 Dan DeLeeuw (fl. 1993-2015), American (?) visual effects artist
 Dianne de Leeuw (b. 1955), Dutch figure skater
 Eddy De Leeuw (1956–2015), Belgian sprinter
 Edith de Leeuw (b. 1962), Dutch psychologist
 Gerry DeLeeuw (born c. 1927), Canadian football player 
 Jan de Leeuw, 15th-century Flemish goldsmith, portrayed by Jan van Eyck
 Jan de Leeuw (b. 1945), Dutch statistician
  (born 1968), Flemish children's book writer and psychologist
 Johanna de Leeuw (b. 1932), Dutch-born American writer
 Karel de Leeuw (1930-1978), American mathematician
 Lisa De Leeuw (b. 1958), American porn actress
 Marcel Deleeuw (born 1943), Dutch-born Canadian football player
 Marine Deleeuw (b. 1994), French fashion model
 Melvin de Leeuw (b. 1988), Dutch footballer
 Michael de Leeuw (b. 1986), Dutch footballer
 Mineke de Leeuw (b. 1938), Dutch author
  (b. 1991), Canadian ski jumper
 Paul de Leeuw (b. 1962), Dutch television comedian, singer and actor
 Puck de Leeuw (1953-2002), Dutch documentary filmmaker
 Reinbert de Leeuw (1938–2020), Dutch conductor, pianist and composer
 Rob deLeeuw (b. 1975), Canadian actor
 Sabrina De Leeuw (b. 1974), Belgian high jumper
 Sarah de Leeuw (b. 1973), Canadian writer
 Thomas de Leeuw (1560-1612), French engraver of Flemish origin
 Ton de Leeuw (1926-1996), Dutch composer
 Ton de Leeuw (born 1941), organizational theorist
Van Leeuw
 Philippe Van Leeuw (born 1954), Belgian film director, screenwriter and cinematographer
Van der Leeuw
 Aart van der Leeuw (1876-1931), Dutch author and poet
 Bastiaan Govertsz van der Leeuw (1624-1680), Dutch landscape painter
 Caroline van der Leeuw (b. 1981), Dutch jazz singer
 Cees van der Leeuw (1890–1973), Dutch industrialist and psychiatrist
 Charles van der Leeuw (b. 1952), Dutch journalist
 Gerard van der Leeuw (1890-1950), Dutch historian and philosopher of religion
 Govert van der Leeuw (1645-1688), Dutch landscape painter, son of Bastiaan
 Joke van der Leeuw-Roord (born 1949), Dutch historian
 Koos van der Leeuw (1893-1934), Dutch theosophist and author
 Marcellino van der Leeuw (b. 1990), Dutch footballer
 Pieter van der Leeuw (1647-1679), Dutch landscape painter, son of Bastiaan

Fictional characters
 Loeki de Leeuw, a lion puppet featured before and after advertisement blocks on Dutch television between 1972 and 2004.

See also
De Vlaamse Leeuw, the official anthem of Flanders

References

Dutch-language surnames

nl:De Leeuw